The EU Individual Open Championship was first contested in Cork, Ireland in 2005, under the auspices of organising body, the European Chess Union (ECU). The event is open to members of chess federations within the European Union. Exceptionally, at the discretion of the organisers, guest players have also been allowed to compete; for example, when the host nation has non-EU neighbours.

The fifth championship, held in Arvier in 2010, was its last edition.

Background

The tournament has been held annually between 2005 and 2008, and again in 2010, sometimes in conjunction with the celebrations of cities awarded European Capital of Culture status. Financial backing has not been consistently high, but in the case of Liverpool 2008, the prize fund totalled £30,000, which was large enough to attract many of the EU's strongest players.

The events were run on an inclusive format, open to a range of players of varying standard, typically from Elo 1600 to 2700 or more, but unrated players are also eligible to play. Substantial prize money is awarded not just to the overall top finishers, but also to the highest finishing women and junior players. Additional prizes go to those showing the best rating improvement over the course of the tournament.

The time limits for play tended not to follow the FIDE format, but more closely resemble classical time limits, to give some assistance to players in the endgame phase.

Results

1st EU Individual Open, Cork 2005

The first European Union Individual Open Championship formed part of the programme of events celebrating Cork City's status as European Capital of Culture for 2005. Played over ten rounds, the event took place 21 March – 3 April 2005 in the Ballroom Suite of the Gresham Metropole Hotel, MacCurtain Street, Cork, Ireland. There were one hundred and fifteen participants and Hungarian grandmaster Zoltan Gyimesi won the event on tie-break from Mateusz Bartel of Poland, who drew level on points in the final round. The highest placed woman player was IM Viktorija Čmilytė of Lithuania with 6½ points.

{|class="wikitable" style="margin: 1em auto 1em auto; "
|  style="background:#f0f0f0;"|Place
|  style="background:#f0f0f0;"|Player
|  style="background:#f0f0f0;"|Title
|  style="background:#f0f0f0;"|Rating
|  style="background:#f0f0f0;"|Nationality
|  style="background:#f0f0f0;"|Result
|-
| 1–2 || Zoltan Gyimesi || GM || 2602 ||  || 8½/10
|-
| || Mateusz Bartel || GM || 2487 ||  || 8½/10
|-
| 3–5 || Bartosz Soćko || GM || 2591 ||  || 7½/10
|-
| || Roland Berzinsh || IM || 2454 ||  || 7½/10
|-
| || Mark Hebden || GM || 2521 ||  || 7½/10
|-
| 6–9 || Slavko Cicak || GM || 2552 ||  || 7/10
|-
| || Joel Benjamin || GM || 2554 ||  || 7/10
|-
| || Normunds Miezis || GM || 2547 ||  || 7/10
|-
| || Alexander Baburin || GM || 2523 ||  || 7/10
|-
|}

2nd EU Individual Open, Liverpool 2006

The second edition of the Championship took place at the World Museum, William Brown Street, Liverpool, England. Held 6–15 September 2006, the tournament entry totalled eighty-four. Going into the final round, host nation grandmaster Nigel Short was the only leading player to win, defeating Mark Hebden to capture clear first place with 7½/10. The highest placed woman player was IM Dagnė Čiukšytė of Lithuania on 6½ points, repeating the achievement of compatriot Cmilyte, in the previous year's event.

{|class="wikitable" style="margin: 1em auto 1em auto; "
|  style="background:#f0f0f0;"|Place
|  style="background:#f0f0f0;"|Player
|  style="background:#f0f0f0;"|Title
|  style="background:#f0f0f0;"|Rating
|  style="background:#f0f0f0;"|Nationality
|  style="background:#f0f0f0;"|Result
|-
| 1 || Nigel Short || GM || 2676 ||  || 7½/10
|-
| 2–9 || Šarūnas Šulskis || GM || 2514 ||  || 7/10
|-
| || Luke McShane || GM || 2614 ||  || 7/10
|-
| || Stephen Gordon || IM || 2443 ||  || 7/10
|-
| || Gawain Jones || IM || 2416 ||  || 7/10
|-
| || Luis Galego || GM || 2528 ||  || 7/10
|-
| || Danny Gormally || GM || 2513 ||  || 7/10
|-
| || Klaus Bischoff || GM || 2533 ||  || 7/10
|-
| || Karel van der Weide || GM || 2446 ||  || 7/10
|-
|}

3rd EU Individual Open, Arvier 2007

The third European Union Individual Open Championship took place June 15-24th 2007, in Arvier (Aosta Valley), Italy. There were one hundred and ten competitors and the tournament was open to the players of the twenty-seven countries of the European Union, plus four additional countries close to the host nation, these being  Croatia, Montenegro, Serbia and Turkey. Serbian Nikola Sedlak took the contest on tie-break from local favourite Michele Godena, after both finished on 8/10. Godena was however awarded the Champion's title, due to Sedlak being a non-EU citizen. IM Cristina Foișor (ROM) was the top finishing woman player with 6½ points.

{|class="wikitable" style="margin: 1em auto 1em auto; "
|  style="background:#f0f0f0;"|Place
|  style="background:#f0f0f0;"|Player
|  style="background:#f0f0f0;"|Title
|  style="background:#f0f0f0;"|Rating
|  style="background:#f0f0f0;"|Nationality
|  style="background:#f0f0f0;"|Result
|-
| 1–2 || Nikola Sedlak || GM || 2575 ||  || 8/10
|-
| || Michele Godena || GM || 2558 ||  || 8/10
|-
| 3–6 || Thomas Luther || GM || 2586 ||  || 7½/10
|-
| || Fabiano Caruana || IM || 2513 ||  || 7½/10
|-
| || Alexander Baburin || GM || 2545 ||  || 7½/10
|-
| || Mišo Cebalo || GM || 2491 ||  || 7½/10
|-
| 7–9 || Šarūnas Šulskis || GM || 2533 ||  || 7/10
|-
| || Nenad Sulava || GM || 2549 ||  || 7/10
|-
| || Marcos Llaneza Vega || IM || 2455 ||  || 7/10
|-
|}

4th EU Individual Open, Liverpool 2008

The fourth edition of the Championship saw a return to the venue of 2006—Liverpool's World Museum. Held September 9-18th 2008, during the city's reign as European Capital of Culture, there were one hundred and forty participants, from twenty member states, competing for a record prize fund. The event was won by Jan Werle of the Netherlands, the best tournament success of his chess career to date. He drew with Maxime Vachier-Lagrave in the final round, while Michael Adams, a half point behind, settled for an early draw with Emanuel Berg, thereby securing a share of second place. The women's top spot was shared between Jovanka Houska, Yelena Dembo and Ketevan Arakhamia-Grant, all on 6 points.

{|class="wikitable" style="margin: 1em auto 1em auto; "
|  style="background:#f0f0f0;"|Place
|  style="background:#f0f0f0;"|Player
|  style="background:#f0f0f0;"|Title
|  style="background:#f0f0f0;"|Rating
|  style="background:#f0f0f0;"|Nationality
|  style="background:#f0f0f0;"|Result
|-
| 1 || Jan Werle || GM || 2591 ||  || 8/10
|-
| 2–4 || Viktor Láznička || GM || 2601 ||  || 7½/10
|-
| || Michael Adams || GM || 2735 ||  || 7½/10
|-
| || Nigel Short || GM || 2655 ||  || 7½/10
|-
| 5–15 || Alberto David || GM || 2568 ||  || 7/10
|-
| || Erwin L'Ami || GM || 2610 ||  || 7/10
|-
| || Maxime Vachier-Lagrave || GM || 2681 ||  || 7/10
|-
| || Daniel Fridman || GM || 2637 ||  || 7/10
|-
| || Emanuel Berg || GM || 2592 ||  || 7/10
|-
| || Étienne Bacrot || GM || 2691 ||  || 7/10
|-
| || David Howell || GM || 2561 ||  || 7/10
|-
| || Sergei Tiviakov || GM || 2645 ||  || 7/10
|-
| || Thomas Luther || GM || 2570 ||  || 7/10
|-
| || Jan Smeets || GM || 2593 ||  || 7/10
|-
| || Alexander Beliavsky || GM || 2606 ||  || 7/10
|-
|}

5th EU Individual Open, Arvier 2010
The fifth edition of the championship took place 4–12 September in Arvier, Italy. There were forty-seven participants. Polish Grandmaster Pawel Jaracz took the title on tiebreak from other five players scoring 6½ points in 9 rounds, and Woman Grandmaster Monica Calzetta Ruiz from Spain was the top finishing woman with 5½ points.

{|class="wikitable" style="margin: 1em auto 1em auto; "
|  style="background:#f0f0f0;"|Place
|  style="background:#f0f0f0;"|Player
|  style="background:#f0f0f0;"|Title
|  style="background:#f0f0f0;"|Rating
|  style="background:#f0f0f0;"|Nationality
|  style="background:#f0f0f0;"|Result
|-
| 1–6 || Pawel Jaracz || GM || 2543 ||  || 6½/9
|-
| || Sabino Brunello || IM || 2497 ||  || 6½/9
|-
| || Evgenij Agrest || GM || 2585 ||  || 6½/9
|-
| || Lexy Ortega || GM || 2473 ||  || 6½/9
|-
| || Miguel Llanes Hurtado || GM || 2474 ||  || 6½/9
|-
| || Clovis Vernay || IM || 2460 ||  || 6½/9
|-
| 7–9 || Sergio Estremera Panos || IM || 2337 ||  || 6/9
|-
| || Mihai Șubă || GM || 2464 ||  || 6/9
|-
| || Mauro Barletta || CM || 2211 ||  || 6/9
|-
|}

See also
 European Individual Chess Championship

References

External links
Liverpool Chess International website – 2006, 2008 events
Chessbase article – 2008 event

Supranational chess championships
Recurring events established in 2005
2005 in chess
Chess competitions
Chess in Europe